The 25th United States Congress was a meeting of the legislative branch of the United States federal government, consisting of the United States Senate and the United States House of Representatives. It met in Washington, D.C. from March 4, 1837, to March 4, 1839, during the first two years of Martin Van Buren's presidency.

The apportionment of seats in the House of Representatives was based on the 1830 United States census. Both chambers had a Democratic majority.

Major events

 March 4, 1837: Martin Van Buren became President of the United States
 May 10, 1837: Panic of 1837
 January 6, 1838: First public demonstration of Samuel Morse's telegraph
 May 26, 1838: Trail of Tears: The Cherokee removal began

Major legislation

Territories organized 
 June 12, 1838: Iowa Territory was formed from the Wisconsin Territory.

Party summary
The count below identifies party affiliations at the beginning of the first session of this congress. Changes resulting from subsequent replacements are shown below in the "Changes in membership" section.

Senate

House of Representatives

Leadership

Senate 

 President: Richard Mentor Johnson (D)
 President pro tempore: William R. King (D)

House of Representatives 
 Speaker: James K. Polk (D)

Members
This list is arranged by chamber, then by state. Senators are listed by class, and representatives by district.

Skip to House of Representatives, below

Senate
Senators were elected by the state legislatures every two years, with one-third beginning new six-year terms with each Congress. Preceding the names in the list below are Senate class numbers, which indicate the cycle of their election. In this Congress, Class 1 meant their term ended with this Congress, ending in 1839; Class 2 meant their term began in the last Congress, ending in 1841; and Class 3 meant their term began in this Congress, ending in 1843.

Alabama 
 2. William R. King (D)
 3. John McKinley (D), until April 22, 1837
 Clement C. Clay (D), from June 19, 1837

Arkansas 
 2. William S. Fulton (D)
 3. Ambrose H. Sevier (D)

Connecticut 
 1. John M. Niles (D)
 3. Perry Smith (D)

Delaware 
 1. Richard H. Bayard (W)
 2. Thomas Clayton (W)

Georgia 
 2. John P. King (D), until November 1, 1837
 Wilson Lumpkin (D), from November 22, 1837
 3. Alfred Cuthbert (D)

Illinois 
 2. John M. Robinson (D)
 3. Richard M. Young (D)

Indiana 
 1. John Tipton (D)
 3. Oliver H. Smith (W)

Kentucky 
 2. John J. Crittenden (W)
 3. Henry Clay (W)

Louisiana 
 2. Robert C. Nicholas (D)
 3. Alexander Mouton (D)

Maine 
 1. Reuel Williams (D)
 2. John Ruggles (D)

Maryland 
 1. Joseph Kent (W), until November 24, 1837
 William D. Merrick (W), from January 4, 1838
 3. John S. Spence (W)

Massachusetts 
 1. Daniel Webster (W)
 2. John Davis (W)

Michigan 
 1. Lucius Lyon (D)
 2. John Norvell (D)

Mississippi 
 1. John Black (W), until January 22, 1838 
 James F. Trotter (D), from January 22, 1838, until July 10, 1838
 Thomas H. Williams (D), from November 12, 1838
 2. Robert J. Walker (D)

Missouri 
 1. Thomas H. Benton (D)
 3. Lewis F. Linn (D)

New Hampshire 
 2. Henry Hubbard (D)
 3. Franklin Pierce (D)

New Jersey 
 1. Samuel L. Southard (W)
 2. Garret D. Wall (D)

New York 
 1. Nathaniel P. Tallmadge (D)
 3. Silas Wright Jr. (D)

North Carolina 
 2. Bedford Brown (D)
 3. Robert Strange (D)

Ohio 
 1. Thomas Morris (D)
 3. William Allen (D)

Pennsylvania 
 1. Samuel McKean (D)
 3. James Buchanan (D)

Rhode Island 
 1. Asher Robbins (W)
 2. Nehemiah R. Knight (W)

South Carolina 
 2. John C. Calhoun (D)
 3. William C. Preston (W)

Tennessee 
 1. Felix Grundy (D), until July 4, 1838
 Ephraim H. Foster (W), from September 17, 1838 – March 3, 1839
 2. Hugh Lawson White (W)

Vermont 
 1. Benjamin Swift (W)
 3. Samuel Prentiss (W)

Virginia 
 1. William C. Rives (D)
 2. Richard E. Parker (D), until March 4, 1837
 William H. Roane (D), from March 14, 1837

House of Representatives 
The names of members of the House of Representatives are preceded by their district numbers.

Alabama 
 . Reuben Chapman (D)
 . Joshua L. Martin (D)
 . Joab Lawler (W), until May 8, 1838
 George W. Crabb (W), from September 4, 1838
 . Dixon H. Lewis (D)
 . Francis S. Lyon (W)

Arkansas 
 . Archibald Yell (D)

Connecticut 
All representatives were elected statewide on a general ticket.
 . Isaac Toucey (D)
 . Samuel Ingham (D)
 . Elisha Haley (D)
 . Thomas T. Whittlesey (D)
 . Lancelot Phelps (D)
 . Orrin Holt (D)

Delaware 
 . John J. Milligan (W)

Georgia 
All representatives were elected statewide on a general ticket.
 . Jesse F. Cleveland (D)
 . William C. Dawson (W)
 . Thomas Glascock (D)
 . Seaton Grantland (D)
 . Charles E. Haynes (D)
 . Hopkins Holsey (D)
 . Jabez Y. Jackson (D)
 . George W. Owens (D)
 . George W. B. Towns (D)

Illinois 
 . Adam W. Snyder (D)
 . Zadok Casey (D)
 . William L. May (D)

Indiana 
 . Ratliff Boon (D)
 . John Ewing (W)
 . William Graham (W)
 . George H. Dunn (W)
 . James Rariden (W)
 . William Herod (W)
 . Albert S. White (W)

Kentucky 
 . John L. Murray (D)
 . Edward Rumsey (W)
 . Joseph R. Underwood (W)
 . Sherrod Williams (W)
 . James Harlan (W)
 . John Calhoon (W)
 . John Pope (W)
 . William J. Graves (W)
 . John White (W)
 . Richard Hawes (W)
 . Richard H. Menefee (W)
 . John Chambers (W)
 . William W. Southgate (W)

Louisiana 
 . Henry Johnson (W)
 . Eleazar W. Ripley (D), until March 2, 1839
 . Rice Garland (W)

Maine 
 . John Fairfield (D), until December 24, 1838
 . Francis O. J. Smith (D)
 . Jonathan Cilley (D), until February 24, 1838
 Edward Robinson (W), from April 28, 1838
 . George Evans (W)
 . Timothy J. Carter (D), until March 14, 1838
 Virgil D. Parris (D), from May 29, 1838 
 . Hugh J. Anderson (D)
 . Joseph C. Noyes (W)
 . Thomas Davee (D)

Maryland 
The 4th district was a plural district with two representatives.
 . John Dennis (W)
 . James A. Pearce (W)
 . John T. H. Worthington (D)
 . Benjamin C. Howard (D)
 . Isaac McKim (D), until April 1, 1838
 John P. Kennedy (W), from April 25, 1838
 . William Cost Johnson (W)
 . Francis Thomas (D)
 . Daniel Jenifer (W)

Massachusetts 
 . Richard Fletcher (W)
 . Stephen C. Phillips (W), until September 28, 1838
 Leverett Saltonstall (W), from December 25, 1838
 . Caleb Cushing (W)
 . William Parmenter (D)
 . Levi Lincoln Jr. (W)
 . George Grennell Jr. (W)
 . George N. Briggs (W)
 . William B. Calhoun (W)
 . William S. Hastings (W)
 . Nathaniel B. Borden (D)
 . John Reed Jr. (W)
 . John Quincy Adams (W)

Michigan 
 . Isaac E. Crary (D)

Mississippi 
Both representatives were elected statewide on a general ticket.
 . John F. H. Claiborne (D), from July 18, 1837, until February 5, 1838
 Seargent S. Prentiss (W), from May 30, 1838
 . Samuel J. Gholson (D), from July 18, 1837, until February 5, 1838
 Thomas J. Word (W), from May 30, 1838

Missouri 
Both representatives were elected statewide on a general ticket.
 . Albert G. Harrison (D)
 . John Miller (D)

New Hampshire 
All representatives were elected statewide on a general ticket.
 . Charles G. Atherton (D)
 . Samuel Cushman (D)
 . James Farrington (D)
 . Joseph Weeks (D)
 . Jared W. Williams (D)

New Jersey 
All representatives were elected statewide on a general ticket.
 . John B. Aycrigg (W)
 . William Halstead (W)
 . John P. B. Maxwell (W)
 . Joseph F. Randolph (W)
 . Charles C. Stratton (W)
 . Thomas Jones Yorke (W)

New York 
There were four plural districts, the 8th, 17th, 22nd & 23rd had two representatives each, the 3rd had four representatives.
 . Thomas B. Jackson (D)
 . Abraham Vanderveer (D)
 . Churchill C. Cambreleng (D)
 . Edward Curtis (W)
 . Ogden Hoffman (W)
 . Ely Moore (D)
 . Gouverneur Kemble (D)
 . Obadiah Titus (D)
 . Nathaniel Jones (D)
 . John C. Brodhead (D)
 . Robert McClellan (D)
 . Zadock Pratt (D)
 . Henry Vail (D)
 . Albert Gallup (D)
 . John I. De Graff (D)
 . David A. Russell (W)
 . John Palmer (D)
 . James B. Spencer (D)
 . John Edwards (D)
 . Arphaxed Loomis (D)
 . Henry A. Foster (D)
 . Abraham P. Grant (D)
 . Isaac H. Bronson (D)
 . John H. Prentiss (D)
 . Amasa J. Parker (D)
 . John C. Clark (D)
 . Andrew D. W. Bruyn (D), until July 27, 1838
 Cyrus Beers (D), from December 3, 1838
 . Hiram Gray (D)
 . Bennet Bicknell (D)
 . William Taylor (D)
 . William H. Noble (D)
 . Samuel Birdsall (D)
 . Mark H. Sibley (W)
 . John T. Andrews (D)
 . Timothy Childs (W)
 . William Patterson (W), until August 14, 1838
 Harvey Putnam (W), from November 7, 1838
 . Luther C. Peck (W)
 . Richard P. Marvin (W)
 . Millard Fillmore (W)
 . Charles F. Mitchell (W)

North Carolina 
 . Samuel T. Sawyer (W)
 . Jesse A. Bynum (D)
 . Edward Stanly (W)
 . Charles B. Shepard (W)
 . James I. McKay (D)
 . Micajah T. Hawkins (D)
 . Edmund Deberry (W)
 . William Montgomery (D)
 . Augustine H. Shepperd (W)
 . Abraham Rencher (W)
 . Henry W. Connor (D)
 . James Graham (W)
 . Lewis Williams (W)

Ohio 
 . Alexander Duncan (D)
 . Taylor Webster (D)
 . Patrick G. Goode (W)
 . Thomas Corwin (W)
 . Thomas L. Hamer (D)
 . Calvary Morris (W)
 . William K. Bond (W)
 . Joseph Ridgway (W)
 . John Chaney (D)
 . Samson Mason (W)
 . James Alexander Jr. (W)
 . Alexander Harper (W)
 . Daniel P. Leadbetter (D)
 . William H. Hunter (D)
 . John W. Allen (W)
 . Elisha Whittlesey (W), until July 9, 1838
 Joshua R. Giddings (W), from December 3, 1838
 . Andrew W. Loomis (W), until October 20, 1837
 Charles D. Coffin (W), from December 20, 1837
 . Matthias Shepler (D)
 . Daniel Kilgore (D), until July 4, 1838
 Henry Swearingen (D), from December 3, 1838

Pennsylvania 
There were two plural districts, the 2nd had two representatives, the 4th had three representatives.
 . Lemuel Paynter (D)
 . John Sergeant (W)
 . George W. Toland (W)
 . Francis J. Harper (D), until March 18, 1837
 Charles Naylor (W), from June 29, 1837
 . Edward Darlington (AM)
 . Edward Davies (AM)
 . David Potts Jr. (AM)
 . Jacob Fry Jr. (D)
 . Mathias Morris (W)
 . David D. Wagener (D)
 . Edward B. Hubley (D)
 . Henry A. P. Muhlenberg (D), until February 9, 1838
 George M. Keim (D), from March 17, 1838
 . Luther Reily (D)
 . Henry Logan (D)
 . Daniel Sheffer (D)
 . Charles McClure (D)
 . William W. Potter (D)
 . David Petrikin (D)
 . Robert H. Hammond (D)
 . Samuel W. Morris (D)
 . Charles Ogle (AM)
 . John J. Klingensmith Jr. (D)
 . Andrew Buchanan (D)
 . Thomas M. T. McKennan (AM)
 . Richard Biddle (AM)
 . William Beatty (D)
 . Thomas Henry (AM)
 . Arnold Plumer (D)

Rhode Island 
Both representatives were elected statewide on a general ticket.
 . Robert B. Cranston (W)
 . Joseph L. Tillinghast (W)

South Carolina 
 . Hugh S. Legaré (D)
 . Robert Rhett (D)
 . John Campbell (N)
 . Franklin H. Elmore (States Rights D)
 . Francis W. Pickens (N)
 . Waddy Thompson Jr. (W)
 . William K. Clowney (N)
 . John P. Richardson (D)
 . John K. Griffin (N)

Tennessee 
 . William B. Carter (W)
 . Abraham McClellan (D)
 . Joseph L. Williams (W)
 . James I. Standifer (W), until August 20, 1837
 William Stone (W), from September 14, 1837
 . Hopkins L. Turney (D)
 . William B. Campbell (W)
 . John Bell (W)
 . Abram P. Maury (W)
 . James K. Polk (D)
 . Ebenezer J. Shields (W)
 . Richard Cheatham (W)
 . John W. Crockett (W)
 . Christopher H. Williams (W)

Vermont 
 . Hiland Hall (W)
 . William Slade (W)
 . Horace Everett (W)
 . Heman Allen (W)
 . Isaac Fletcher (D)

Virginia 
 . Francis Mallory (W)
 . Francis E. Rives (D)
 . John W. Jones (D)
 . George C. Dromgoole (D)
 . James W. Bouldin (D)
 . Walter Coles (D)
 . Archibald Stuart (D)
 . Henry A. Wise (W)
 . Robert M. T. Hunter (W)
 . John Taliaferro (W)
 . John Robertson (W)
 . James Garland (D)
 . John M. Patton (D), until April 7, 1838
 Linn Banks (D), from April 28, 1838
 . Charles F. Mercer (W)
 . James M. Mason (D)
 . Isaac S. Pennybacker (D)
 . Robert Craig (D)
 . George W. Hopkins (D)
 . Andrew Beirne (D)
 . Joseph Johnson (D)
 . William S. Morgan (D)

Non-voting members 
 . Charles Downing
 . William W. Chapman (D), from September 10, 1838
 . George Wallace Jones (D), until January 14, 1839
 James D. Doty (D), from January 14, 1839

Changes in membership 
The count below reflects changes from the beginning of the first session of this Congress.

Senate 
 Replacements: 6
 Democrats: no net change
 Whigs: no net change
 Deaths: 1
 Resignations: 6
 Total seats with changes: 7

|-
| Virginia(2)
|  | Richard E. Parker (D)
|  Resigned March 4, 1837, after accepting a seat on the Virginia Supreme Court of Appeals
|  | William H. Roane (D)
| Elected March 14, 1837
|-
| Alabama(3)
|  | John McKinley (D)
|  Resigned April 22, 1837, after being appointed Associate Justice of the United States Supreme Court
|  | Clement C. Clay (D)
| Elected June 19, 1837
|-
| Georgia(2)
|  | John P. King (D)
|  Resigned November 1, 1837
|  | Wilson Lumpkin (D)
| Elected November 22, 1837
|-
| Maryland(1)
|  | Joseph Kent (W)
|  Died November 24, 1837
|  | William D. Merrick (W)
| Elected January 4, 1838
|-
| Mississippi(1)
|  | John Black (W)
|  Resigned January 22, 1838
|  | James F. Trotter (D)
| Appointed January 22, 1838
|-
| Tennessee(1)
|  | Felix Grundy (D)
|  Resigned July 4, 1838, after being appointed United States Attorney General
|  | Ephraim H. Foster (W)
| Elected September 17, 1838
|-
| Mississippi(1)
|  | James F. Trotter (D)
|  Resigned July 10, 1838
|  | Thomas H. Williams (D)
| Appointed November 12, 1838, and subsequently elected
|-
| Tennessee(1)
|  | Ephraim H. Foster (W)
|  Resigned March 3, 1839 before start of new Congress under orders of state legislature.
| Vacant
| 
|}

House of Representatives 
 Replacements: 16
 Democrats: 5-seat net loss
 Whigs: 5-seat net gain
 Deaths: 9
 Resignations: 6
 Contested election:1
Total seats with changes: 20

|-
| 
| Vacant
|  Rep-elect Claiborne presented credentials July 18, 1837
|  | John F. H. Claiborne (D)
| Seated July 18, 1837
|-
| 
| Vacant
|  Rep-elect Gholson presented credentials July 18, 1837
|  | Samuel J. Gholson (D)
| Seated July 18, 1837
|-
| 
|  | Francis J. Harper (D)
|  Died March 18, 1837
|  | Charles Naylor (W)
| Seated June 29, 1837
|-
| 
|  | James I. Standifer (W)
|  Died August 20, 1837
|  | William Stone (W)
| Seated September 14, 1837
|-
| 
|  | Elisha Whittlesey (W)
|  Resigned October 20, 1837
|  | Charles D. Coffin (W)
| Seated December 20, 1837
|-
| 
|  | John F. H. Claiborne (D)
|  Seat declared vacant February 5, 1838
|  | Seargent S. Prentiss (W)
| Seated May 30, 1838
|-
| 
|  | Samuel J. Gholson (D)
|  Seat declared vacant February 5, 1838
|  | Thomas J. Word (W)
| Seated May 30, 1838
|-
| 
|  | Henry A. P. Muhlenberg (D)
|  Resigned February 9, 1838, after being appointed Minister to Austrian Empire
|  | George M. Keim (D)
| Seated March 17, 1838
|-
| 
|  | Jonathan Cilley (D)
|  Killed in a duel February 24, 1838, by Rep. William J. Graves
|  | Edward Robinson (W)
| Seated April 28, 1838
|-
| 
|  | Timothy J. Carter (D)
|  Died March 14, 1838
|  | Virgil D. Parris (D)
| Seated May 29, 1838
|-
| 
|  | Isaac McKim (D)
|  Died April 1, 1838
|  | John P. Kennedy (W)
| Seated April 25, 1838
|-
| 
|  | John M. Patton (D)
|  Resigned April 7, 1838
|  | Linn Banks (D)
| Seated April 28, 1838
|-
| 
|  | Joab Lawler (W)
|  Died May 8, 1838
|  | George W. Crabb (W)
| Seated October 5, 1835
|-
| 
|  | Daniel Kilgore (D)
|  Resigned July 4, 1838
|  | Henry Swearingen (D)
| Seated December 3, 1838
|-
| 
|  | Elisha Whittlesey (W)
|  Resigned July 9, 1838
|  | Joshua R. Giddings (W)
| Seated December 3, 1838
|-
| 
|  | Andrew D. Bruyn (D)
|  Died July 27, 1838
|  | Cyrus Beers (D)
| Seated December 3, 1838
|-
| 
|  | William Patterson (W)
|  Died August 14, 1838
|  | Harvey Putnam (W)
| Seated November 7, 1838
|-
| 
| New seat
|  Iowa Territory seated its first delegate September 10, 1838
|  | George Wallace Jones (D)
| Seated September 10, 1838

|-
| 
|  | Stephen C. Phillips (W)
|  Seat declared vacant September 28, 1838
|  | Leverett Saltonstall (W)
| Seated December 15, 1838
|-
| 
|  | John Fairfield (D)
|  Resigned December 24, 1838, after being elected Governor of Maine
| Vacant
| Not filled this congress
|-
| 
|  | George Wallace Jones (D)
|  Lost contested election January 14, 1839
|  | James D. Doty (D)
| Seated January 14, 1839
|-
| 
|  | Eleazar W. Ripley (D)
|  Died March 2, 1839
| Vacant
| Not filled this congress
|}

Committees
Lists of committees and their party leaders.

Senate

 Agriculture (Chairman: Perry Smith)
 Audit and Control the Contingent Expenses of the Senate (Chairman: Samuel McKean)
 Claims (Chairman: Henry Hubbard)
 Commerce (Chairman: William R. King)
 Danger of Steam Vessels (Select)
 Distributing Public Revenue Among the States (Select)
 District of Columbia (Chairman: William H. Roane)
 Engrossed Bills (Chairman: John Norvell)
 Finance (Chairman: Silas Wright)
 Foreign Relations (Chairman: James Buchanan)
 Indian Affairs (Chairman: Hugh Lawson White)
 Judiciary (Chairman: Felix Grundy)
 Letter of Mr. Ruggles (Select)
 Manufactures (Chairman: John M. Niles)
 Memorial of A. B. Quinby (Select)
 Memorial of the Citizens of Georgetown (DC) for the Retrocession of that Part of the District (Select)
 Memorial of Duff Green (Select)
 Memorial of Edward D. Tippett (Select)
 Mileage of Members of Congress (Select)
 Military Affairs (Chairman: Thomas Hart Benton)
 Militia (Chairman: Clement C. Clay)
 Naval Affairs (Chairman: William C. Rives)
 Occupation of the Columbia River (Select)
 Oregon Territory (Select)
 Patents and the Patent Office (Chairman: John Ruggles then Robert Strange)
 Pensions (Chairman: Thomas Morris)
 Post Office and Post Roads (Chairman: John M. Robinson)
 Private Land Claims (Chairman: Lewis F. Linn)
 Public Buildings and Grounds (Chairman: N/A)
 Public Lands (Chairman: Robert J. Walker)
 Purchasing Boyd Reilly's Gas Apparatus (Select)
 Revolutionary Claims (Chairman: Bedford Brown)
 Roads and Canals (Chairman: Thomas Tipton)
 Tariff Regulation (Select)
 Whole

House of Representatives

 Accounts (Chairman: Joseph Johnson)
 Agriculture (Chairman: Edmund Deberry)
 Amendment to the Constitution (Select)
 Claims (Chairman: John Chambers)
 Commerce (Chairman: Samuel Cushman)
 District of Columbia (Chairman: James W. Bouldin)
 Elections (Chairman: Andrew Buchanan)
 Expenditures in the Navy Department (Chairman: John C. Brodhead)
 Expenditures in the Post Office Department (Chairman: Timothy Childs)
 Expenditures in the State Department (Chairman: Mathias Morris)
 Expenditures in the Treasury Department (Chairman: Heman Allen)
 Expenditures in the War Department (Chairman: William K. Clowney)
 Expenditures on Public Buildings (Chairman: Samuel T. Sawyer)
 Foreign Affairs (Chairman: Benjamin C. Howard)
 Indian Affairs (Chairman: John Bell)
 Invalid Pensions (Chairman: William Taylor)
 Judiciary (Chairman: Francis Thomas)
 Manufactures (Chairman: John Quincy Adams)
 Mileage (Chairman: William C. Dawson)
 Military Affairs (Chairman: James I. McKay)
 Militia (Chairman: David D. Wagener)
 Naval Affairs (Chairman: Samuel Ingham)
 Patents (Chairman: Isaac Fletcher)
 Post Office and Post Roads (Chairman: Henry W. Connor)
 Private Land Claims (Chairman: William L. May)
 Public Buildings and Grounds (Chairman: Levi Lincoln Jr.)
 Public Expenditures (Chairman: Elisha Haley)
 Public Lands (Chairman: Ratliff Boon until 1838, then Zadok Casey)
 Revisal and Unfinished Business (Chairman: Matthias Shepler)
 Revolutionary Claims (Chairman: Robert Craig)
 Revolutionary Pensions (Chairman: William S. Morgan)
 Roads and Canals (Chairman: Charles F. Mercer)
 Rules (Select)
 Standards of Official Conduct
 Territories (Chairman: Isaac H. Bronson)
 Ways and Means (Chairman: Churchill C. Cambreleng)
 Whole

Joint committees

 Enrolled Bills
 The Library

Employees 
 Librarian of Congress: John Silva Meehan

Senate 
 Chaplain: John R. Goodman (Episcopalian), until September 11, 1837
Henry Slicer (Methodist), elected September 11, 1837
 Secretary: Asbury Dickins
 Sergeant at Arms: John Shackford (died)
 Stephen Haight, elected September 4, 1837

House of Representatives 
 Chaplain: Septimus Tustin (Presbyterian), elected September 4, 1837
 Levi R. Reese (Methodist), elected December 4, 1837
 Clerk: Walter S. Franklin, until September 20, 1838 (died)
 Hugh A. Garland, elected December 3, 1838
 Doorkeeper: Overton Carr
 Postmaster: William J. McCormick
 Reading Clerks: 
 Sergeant at Arms: Roderick Dorsey

See also 
 1836 United States elections (elections leading to this Congress)
 1836 United States presidential election
 1836–37 United States Senate elections
 1836–37 United States House of Representatives elections
 1838 United States elections (elections during this Congress, leading to the next Congress)
 1838–39 United States Senate elections
 1838–39 United States House of Representatives elections

Notes

References

External links
Statutes at Large, 1789-1875 
Senate Journal, First Forty-three Sessions of Congress
House Journal, First Forty-three Sessions of Congress
Biographical Directory of the U.S. Congress 
U.S. House of Representatives: House History 
U.S. Senate: Statistics and Lists